Upperton may refer to:

 Upperton, North Lanarkshire, Scotland
 Upperton, West Sussex, England

See also
 Upper Town (disambiguation), including uses of Uppertown